The 2021 Benelux World RX of Spa-Francorchamps was the sixth round of the eighth season of the FIA World Rallycross Championship. The event was held at the Circuit de Spa-Francorchamps in Francorchamps, Belgium.

World RX1 Championship 

Source

Heats

Semi-finals 

 Semi-Final 1

Note: Semi-Final 1 race winner Timmy Hansen was handed a five-second penalty, as the driver to hit Kevin Abbring at the Raidillon hairpin.

 Semi-Final 2

Final

Standings after the event 

Source

 Note: Only the top six positions are included.

References 

|- style="text-align:center"
|width="35%"|Previous race:2021 World RX of Riga
|width="40%"|FIA World Rallycross Championship2021 season
|width="35%"|Next race:2021 World RX of Montalegre
|- style="text-align:center"
|width="35%"|Previous race:2019 World RX of Benelux
|width="40%"|World RX of Benelux
|width="35%"|Next race:2022 World RX of Benelux
|- style="text-align:center"

Belgium
World RX
World RX